Praepositinus (Gilbert Prevostin of Cremona, Prevostinus Cremonensis) ( 1135 – 1210) was an Italian scholastic philosopher and theologian. He was a liturgical commentator, and supporter a res-theory of belief. He discussed intentional contexts.

Having studied under Petrus Comestor and taught at Paris, he went to Mainz Cathedral in 1196. Returning, he was Chancellor of the University of Paris from c. 1206 to 1209.

A Summa contra haereticos from around 1200 was once attributed to him.

References
Georges Lacombe (1927) La vie et les oeuvres de Prévostin (Praepositinus Cancellarii Parisiensis (1206–1210) Opera Omnia)
Joseph N. Garvin, James A. Corbett (1958), The Summa Contra Haereticos Ascribed to Praepostinus of Cremona
James A. Corbett (editor) (1969), Praepositini Cremonensis Tractatus de officiis

Notes

1150s births
1210 deaths
Scholastic philosophers
12th-century Italian Roman Catholic theologians
Writers from Cremona
Chancellors of the University of Paris
Medieval Paris
12th-century philosophers
12th-century Latin writers